Beaver Lake State Park is a public recreation area located in Logan County, North Dakota, about equidistant from Napoleon and Wishek. The state park occupies  of land on the western shore of  Beaver Lake and offers hiking, boating, swimming, fishing, cabins, and campground.

History
The park began through the encouragement of local residents who met in 1929 at Shepard’s Pavilion, which is located just south of the eventual park boundary, to promote creation of a state park honoring the early settlers who lived on the shores of Beaver Lake. Dedication ceremonies took place in July 1932. In 1933, the lake's water level was raised with the damming of Beaver Creek. Laborers with the Works Progress Administration worked in the park in 1935 and 1936, creating roads, paths, an earthen dock, and picnic area. Their work is memorialized with a stone monument in the park.

References

External links
Beaver Lake State Park North Dakota Parks and Recreation Department 
Beaver Lake State Park Map North Dakota Parks and Recreation Department

State parks of North Dakota
Protected areas established in 1932
1932 establishments in North Dakota
Protected areas of Logan County, North Dakota
Works Progress Administration in North Dakota